Juan Luis Marén Delis (born August 20, 1971) is a Cuban wrestler (Greco-Roman style) who has won three Olympic medals. He was born in Santiago de Cuba.

References

External links
 

1971 births
Living people
Wrestlers at the 1992 Summer Olympics
Wrestlers at the 1996 Summer Olympics
Wrestlers at the 2000 Summer Olympics
Cuban male sport wrestlers
Wrestlers at the 2004 Summer Olympics
Olympic wrestlers of Cuba
Olympic silver medalists for Cuba
Olympic bronze medalists for Cuba
Olympic medalists in wrestling
Medalists at the 2000 Summer Olympics
Medalists at the 1996 Summer Olympics
Medalists at the 1992 Summer Olympics
Pan American Games gold medalists for Cuba
Pan American Games medalists in wrestling
Wrestlers at the 2003 Pan American Games
Medalists at the 2003 Pan American Games
20th-century Cuban people
21st-century Cuban people